Tohu Harris (born 7 January 1992) is a New Zealand professional rugby league footballer who plays as a  and  forward and captains the New Zealand Warriors in the NRL, and New Zealand and the New Zealand Māori at international level.

He previously played for the Melbourne Storm with whom he won the 2017 NRL Grand Final.

Background
Harris was born in Hastings, New Zealand, and is of Maori descent.

Harris played his junior football for the Tamatea rugby union club and attended  Hastings Boys' High School before being signed by the Melbourne Storm. In 2007, Harris played for the New Zealand U15's team. Harris played for the Storm's NYC team from 2010 to 2012, scoring 25 tries in 49 games.

Playing career

2013
In Round 1 of the 2013 NRL season, Harris made his NRL debut for the Storm against the St. George Illawarra Dragons at second-row in the 30-10 win at AAMI Park. Harris was called up to the New Zealand national rugby league team squad as 18th man for the 2013 Anzac Test, replacing Jeremy Smith. Harris was promoted to the playing squad on the day of the test match when captain Simon Mannering was ruled out with a calf injury and made his debut for New Zealand on 19 April 2013 in the Kiwis 32-12 loss against Australia. In Round 13 against the Cronulla-Sutherland Sharks, Harris scored his first NRL career try in the Storm's 38-6 win at AAMI Park. Harris finished his debut year in the NRL with him playing in 25 matches and scoring 2 tries for the Melbourne Storm in the 2013 NRL season. On 9 October, Harris was dropped from the New Zealand side for the 2013 World Cup, which had been announced a day earlier. The decision was made following the controversial change of mind of Sonny Bill Williams, who had previously ruled himself out of the competition, to join the squad. Harris turned down a position to tour with the squad and play in a pre-tournament match against the Cook Islands in order to have minor surgery and rest before the 2014 NRL pre-season began. Harris also refused to respond to Williams after the latter tried to reach out to him after the much publicized U-turn.

2014
In February, Harris was included in the Storm's inaugural 2014 Auckland Nines squad. In Round 4 against the Canterbury-Bankstown Bulldogs, after Cameron Smith suffered a back spasm in the warm up, Harris was appointed the goal kicker; he kicked 2 goals in the 40-12 loss. He scored a try in the Kiwis 30-18 loss. On 7 May, Harris re-signed with the Storm on a 3-year contract keeping him with the club till the end of the 2017 season. Harris played in all of the Storm's 25 matches, kicking 2 goals.

Harris played for New Zealand in the 2014 Four Nations. He came off the interchange bench in the Kiwis' 22-18 final win over Australia.

2015
On 3 May, Harris played for New Zealand  in the 2015 Anzac Test, playing at second-row in the Kiwis' 26-12 win. In July, the Storm played the first ever NRL game at McLean Park in Napier, New Zealand, against the St George Illawarra Dragons. Harris designed the team's jersey for the occasion. The Storm won the match 22-4. Harris played in all of the Storm's 26 matches for the season, scoring 5 tries and kicking 3 goals. He was selected in the 23-man New Zealand squad to tour England, playing in all 3 matches of a 2-1 Baskerville Shield series loss. He scored 1 try, in the first test.

2016
In the pre-season, Harris played in the 2016 NRL Auckland Nines squad. On 6 May, Harris played at centre for New Zealand in the 2016 Anzac Test, as they lost 16-0. In Round 26 against the Cronulla-Sutherland Sharks, he played his 100th NRL match in a 26-6 win at AAMI Park. On 2 October, in the Storm’s 2016 NRL Grand Final against the Cronulla-Sutherland Sharks, Harris started at second-row in the 14-12 defeat.

Harris again played in all the Storm’s 27 matches for the season, scoring 8 tries and kicking 1 goal. In the 2016 Four Nations tournament, he played in 4 matches, including starting at fullback and scoring 2 tries in the 34-8 final loss against Australia.

2017
On 31 January, it was announced that Harris signed a lucrative 4-year deal with the New Zealand Warriors, starting in 2018. Harris said about of the signing, "I’ve had a great time with the Storm and I owe them so much for what they’ve done for me. Coming home to play for the Warriors is a fantastic opportunity, though. The club has a great roster with so many Kiwi boys there and being back in New Zealand closer to family is a big attraction". Harris missed the first two months of the season after suffering a foot injury in the off-season. He made his first appearance of the season in Round 10 against the Gold Coast Titans, in a shock 38-36 upset loss at Suncorp Stadium. On 1 October, in the Storm’s 2017 NRL Grand Final against the North Queensland Cowboys, Harris started at second-row and had a blinder of a performance in the 34-6 victory. In his last year with the Melbourne Storm he played in 14 matches, scoring 3 tries and kicking 1 goal. After the grand final victory, Harris was ruled out of the 2017 Rugby League World Cup due to niggling shoulder and foot injuries.

2018
In Round 1 of the 2018 NRL season, Harris made his club debut for the New Zealand Warriors against the South Sydney Rabbitohs, starting at second-row in the 32-20 win at Perth Stadium.

2019 & 2020
In the 2019 NRL season, he made 13 appearances as the club missed out on the finals.  In the 2020 NRL season, Harris played 20 games as the New Zealand Warriors again missed out on the finals.

2021
On 18 July, Harris was ruled out for the remainder of the 2021 NRL season after suffering an ACL injury in the club's loss against Penrith.

2022
Harris made a total of 15 appearances for the New Zealand Warriors in the 2022 NRL season as they finished 15th on the table.

Honours
 2013 World Club Challenge Winners
 2016 NRL Grand Final Runner-up
 2017 NRL Grand Final Winners
 2020 NRL Second Rower of the Year

Personal life
Harris married his wife Natalie in January 2014.

References

External links
New Zealand Warriors profile
NRL profile

1992 births
Living people
New Zealand rugby league players
Ngāti Kahungunu people
New Zealand Māori rugby league players
New Zealand national rugby league team players
New Zealand Māori rugby league team players
Melbourne Storm players
New Zealand Warriors players
Junior Kiwis players
Rugby league second-rows
Rugby league locks
Rugby league centres
Rugby league five-eighths
Rugby league players from Hawke's Bay Region
Sunshine Coast Falcons players